Barbra Streisand is an American singer, actress, and filmmaker. With a career spanning seven decades, she has achieved success in multiple fields of entertainment and is one of the few entertainers who have been awarded an Emmy, Grammy, Oscar, and Tony Award (EGOT).

Streisand began her career by performing in nightclubs and Broadway theaters in the early 1960s. Following her guest appearances on various television shows, she signed to Columbia Records and released her debut album, The Barbra Streisand Album (1963). It won two Grammy Awards, including Album of the Year. Throughout her recording career, Streisand has topped the US Billboard 200 chart with 11 albums—a record for a woman—including People (1964), The Way We Were (1974), Guilty (1980), and Higher Ground (1997). She has attained five number-one singles on the US Billboard Hot 100 chart: "The Way We Were", "Evergreen", "You Don't Bring Me Flowers", "No More Tears (Enough Is Enough)", and "Woman in Love".

After becoming an established recording artist in the 1960s, Streisand ventured into film by the end of that decade. She starred in the critically acclaimed Funny Girl (1968), for which she won the Academy Award for Best Actress. Her other films include Hello, Dolly! (1969), The Owl and the Pussycat (1970), What's Up, Doc? (1972), The Way We Were (1973), Funny Lady (1975), Yentl (1983), Nuts (1987), The Prince of Tides (1991), and The Mirror Has Two Faces (1996). For her film A Star Is Born (1976), she won her second Academy Award, composing music for the love theme "Evergreen", the first woman to be honored as a composer. With the release of Yentl (1983), Streisand became the first woman to write, produce, direct, and star in a major studio film. The film won an Oscar for Best Score and a Golden Globe for Best Motion Picture Musical. Streisand also received the Golden Globe Award for Best Director, becoming the first (and for 37 years, the only) woman to win that award.

With sales of over 150 million records worldwide, Streisand is one of the best-selling recording artists of all time.  According to the Recording Industry Association of America (RIAA), she is the highest-certified female artist in the United States, with 68.5 million certified album units tying with Mariah Carey. Billboard honored Streisand as the greatest Billboard 200 female artist of all time. Her accolades include two Academy Awards, 10 Grammy Awards including the Grammy Lifetime Achievement Award and the Grammy Legend Award, five Emmy Awards, four Peabody Awards, the Presidential Medal of Freedom, and nine Golden Globes.

Recognitions

Notes

References

Barbra Streisand
Streisand, Barbra